Postcoital bleeding is bleeding from the vagina after sexual intercourse and may or may not be associated with pain. The bleeding can be from the uterus, cervix, vagina and other tissue or organs located near the vagina. Postcoital bleeding can be one of the first indications of cervical cancer. There are other reasons why vaginal bleeding may occur after intercourse. Some people will bleed after intercourse for the first time but others will not. The hymen may bleed if it is stretched since it is thin tissue. Other activities may have an effect on the vagina such as sports and tampon use. Postcoital bleeding may stop without treatment. In some instances, postcoital bleeding may resemble menstrual irregularities. Postcoital bleeding may occur throughout pregnancy. The presence of cervical polyps may result in postcoital bleeding during pregnancy because the tissue of the polyps is more easily damaged. Postcoital bleeding can be due to trauma after consensual and non-consensual sexual intercourse.

A diagnosis to determine the cause will include obtaining a medical history and assessing the symptoms. Treatment is not always necessary.

Causes 
Vaginal bleeding after sex is a symptom that can indicate:
 pelvic inflammatory disease
 pelvic organ prolapse
 uterine disease
 chlamydia or other sexually transmitted infection
 atrophic vaginitis 
 childbirth
inadequate vaginal lubrication
 benign polyps 
 cervical erosion (inflammation of the cervix)
 cervical or vaginal cancer
 anatomical abnormality of the uterus, vagina or both. 
 pregnancy 
 endometrial polyps 
 endometrial hyperplasia 
 endometrial carcinoma 
 leiomyomata 
 cervicitis 
 cervical dysplasia 
 endometriosis 
 coagulation defects 
 trauma 
  
Bleeding from hemorrhoids and vulvar lesions can be mistaken for postcoital bleeding. Post coital bleeding can occur with discharge, itching, or irritation. This may be due to Trichomonas or Candida. A lack of estrogen can make vaginal tissue thinner and more susceptible to bleeding. Some have proposed that birth control pills may cause postcoital bleeding.

Risk factors for developing postcoital bleeding are: low estrogen levels, rape and 'rough sex'.

Diagnosis and treatment 
Tests and detailed examination are used to determine the cause of the bleeding:
 a pregnancy test
 a pelvic examination 
 obtaining tissue samples
 pap smear
 colposcopic examination of the vagina and cervix
 ultrasound
 histogram
 cultures for bacteria
 biopsy of tissues

A referral may be made to a specialist. Imaging may not be necessary. Cryotherapy has been used but is not recommended.

Epidemiology 
Postcoital bleeding rarely is associated with gynecological cancer in young women and its incidence is projected to drop due to the widespread immunizations against HPV. Postcoital bleeding has been most studied in women in the US. Those with postcoital bleeding had a higher risk of cervical dysplasia and cervical cancer. Benign causes of postcoital bleeding were associated with cervical erosion, ectropion, vaginitis and vulvovaginitis. Other associations were noted such as the presence of leukoplakia of the cervix, an intrauterine contraceptive device, cervical polyps, cervicitis, menopause, dyspareunia, and vulvodynia. In Scotland approximately 1 in 600 women aged 20–24 experience unexplained bleeding. A study of African women found that trauma from consensual sexual intercourse was a cause of postcoital bleeding in young women.

In society and culture 
Hymenorrhaphy is a controversial procedure to surgically repair a damaged hymen, thus restoring the appearance of virginity:

See also
Gynecologic hemorrhage
Menstruation
Metrorrhagia
Female genital mutilation

References 

  

 
Human female reproductive system
Women and sexuality
Women's health
Anatomy
Gynaecology
Human pregnancy